Molly J. Crockett is an American neuroscientist who studies human morality, altruism and decision making. She received the 2019 Janet Taylor Spence Award from the Association for Psychological Science.

Career

Molly Crockett is an Associate Professor of Psychology at Yale University. Previously she was an Associate Professor of Experimental Psychology at the University of Oxford, a fellow at University College London and University of Zürich, funded by the Sir Henry Wellcome Postdoctoral Fellowship from the Wellcome Trust, awarded in 2010.  Originally from Irvine, California, after a Bachelor of Science at UCLA she completed her PhD at the University of Cambridge (King's College, Cambridge) where she was a Gates Cambridge Scholar.

Work
Crockett studies behavioral neuroscience, with a particular focus on the role of neurotransmitters on decision-making, for example studying how antidepressants effect negotiations in experimental settings. She has criticized science journalists for over hyping the generality of some of her research findings.

Recently, Crockett has begun researching moral outrage.

Works

References

External links
 
 
 Beware Neuro Bunk; TED talk, 2012
 Drugs and Morals 2011 TEDx talk, 2011

Living people
American neuroscientists
Academics of University College London
Alumni of King's College, Cambridge
Moral psychologists
People from Irvine, California
Year of birth missing (living people)
American women neuroscientists
Yale University faculty
21st-century American scientists
21st-century American women scientists
American women academics